Maíz con hielo (literally "corn with ice" in Spanish, also commonly spelled mais kon-yelo in Tagalog) is a shaved ice dessert from the Philippines made with boiled corn kernels, sugar, and milk.

Ingredients
Maíz con hielo is a mixture of shaved ice, corn kernels, sugar and milk. Usually popular in the summer months, it is a variation of the more renowned halo-halo.

Preparation
The dessert is prepared by adding shaved ice to a glass then pouring evaporated milk on top of the ice. It is then topped off with cream corn and sugar. Vanilla ice cream can also be added on top if desired. It is also stirred before eating.

See also
Saba con hielo
Halo-halo
Ice buko
Sorbetes
Binatog
Binaki

References

Philippine desserts
Frozen desserts
Maize dishes
Milk dishes